The 1946 South Carolina gubernatorial election was held on November 5, 1946 to select the governor of the state of South Carolina. Strom Thurmond won the contested Democratic primary and ran unopposed in the general election becoming the 103rd governor of South Carolina.

Democratic primary
The South Carolina Democratic Party held their primary for governor in the summer of 1946 and ten candidates entered the contest. The race featured Governor Ransome Judson Williams, who became governor in 1945 upon the resignation of Olin D. Johnston, but it mainly became a contest between Strom Thurmond and James McLeod. Strom Thurmond was a World War II veteran and advocated a progressive platform whereas, James McLeod, a physician from Florence County, had the support of the "Barnwell Ring" and sought to maintain the status quo. Race was not an issue in the campaign and Strom Thurmond emerged victorious with the support of the returning veterans of World War II who wanted to reform South Carolina.

General election
The general election was held on November 5, 1946 and Strom Thurmond was elected the next governor of South Carolina without opposition on account of South Carolina's effective status as a one-party state. Being a non-presidential election and with few contested races, turnout was much lower than in the Democratic primary election.

 

|-
| 
| colspan=5 |Democratic hold
|-

See also
Governor of South Carolina
List of governors of South Carolina
South Carolina gubernatorial elections

References

"Supplemental Report of the Secretary of State to the General Assembly of South Carolina." Reports and Resolutions of South Carolina to the General Assembly of the State of South Carolina. Volume I. Columbia, South Carolina: 1947, p. 10.

External links
SCIway Biography of Governor James Strom Thurmond

1946
1946 United States gubernatorial elections
Gubernatorial
November 1946 events in the United States
Strom Thurmond